The 1999–2000 cricket season in Bangladesh saw the introduction of the National Cricket League, although it did not have first-class status until the 2000–01 season. Internationally, the country hosted tours by the West Indies, England A and Marylebone Cricket Club (MCC).

International tours
In October 1999, West Indies led by Brian Lara played a single first-class match against the Bangladesh national team, which was drawn. The teams also played a two-match series of Limited Overs Internationals (LOI) which West Indies won 2–0.

In October and November, an England A team visited Bangladesh en route to New Zealand and played five matches. Two of these were first-class matches, both being drawn, and one was a List A limited overs match, all three against the national team. England A won the limited overs match by 5 wickets.

In January 2000, Marylebone Cricket Club (MCC) toured the country to play five matches including one first-class against the national team. This was drawn.

Bangladesh in their matches against the touring teams were captained by Aminul Islam.

National Cricket League launched
The National Cricket League was launched with six teams taking part, each representing one of the country's administrative divisions. The teams were:
 Barisal Division 
 Chittagong Division 
 Dhaka Division
 Khulna Division 
 Rajshahi Division
 Sylhet Division

The championship was won by Chittagong, who won seven of their ten matches played.

See also
 History of cricket in Bangladesh

References

Further reading
 Wisden Cricketers' Almanack 2001

1999 in Bangladeshi cricket
2000 in Bangladeshi cricket
Bangladeshi cricket seasons from 1971–72 to 2000
Domestic cricket competitions in 1999–2000